The Ottoman Empire used various of flags, especially as naval ensigns, during its history.
The star and crescent came into use in the second half of the 18th century. A  (decree) from 1793 required that the ships of the Ottoman Navy were to use a red flag with the star and crescent in white.
In 1844, a version of this flag, with a five-pointed star, was officially adopted as the Ottoman national flag. The decision to adopt a national flag was part of the Tanzimat reforms which aimed to modernize the Ottoman state in line with the laws and norms of contemporary European states and institutions. 

The star and crescent design later became a common element in the national flags of Ottoman successor states in the 20th century.
The current flag of Turkey is essentially the same as the late Ottoman flag, but has more specific legal standardizations (regarding its measures, geometric proportions, and exact tone of red) that were introduced with the Turkish Flag Law on 29 May 1936. Before the legal standardization, the star and crescent could have slightly varying slimness or positioning depending on the rendition.

Early flag 
Pre-modern Ottoman armies used the horse-tail standard or tugh rather than flags.
Such standards remained in use alongside flags until the 19th century.
War flags came into use by the 16th century. During the 16th and 17th centuries, Ottoman war flags often depicted the bifurcated Zulfiqar sword, often misinterpreted in Western literature as showing a pair of scissors.
the Topkapı Museum exhibits a Zulfiqar flag claimed to have been used by Sultan Selim I. Two Zulfiqar flags are also depicted in a plate dedicated to Turkish flags in vol. 7 of Bernard Picart's  (1737), attributed to the Janissaries and the Ottoman cavalry.

The crescent symbol appears in flags attributed to Tunis from as early as the 14th century, long before Tunis fell under Ottoman rule in 1574. But the crescent as a symbol also had 14th-century associations with the Ottoman military 
and millennium-long associations with the city of Istanbul,
which became the Ottoman capital after  its conquest in 1453. The Spanish Navy Museum in Madrid shows two Ottoman naval flags dated 1613; both are swallow-tailed, one green with a white crescent near the hoist, the other white with two red stripes near the edges of the flag and a red crescent near the hoist.

According to Rıza Nur, sultan Selim I (1512-20) had a white personal flag, while the Ottoman Army flag was red (kızıl bayrak). During Süleyman I's reign (1520-66) the janissaries had a white flag while the timariot cavalry had a red flag. It was used as the Ottoman civic and merchant flag from 1793 to 1923.

Star and Crescent flag

Following the conquest of Constantinople in 1453, the crescent moon and star symbol started being used on Turkic peoples flags. Ottoman flags were originally commonly green, but the flag was defined as red by decree in 1793 and an eight-pointed star was added. The red version of the flag had become ubiquitous by the reign of Selim III. The five pointed star did not appear until the 1840s.

With the Tanzimat reforms in the 19th century, flags were redesigned in the style of the European armies of the day. The flag of the Ottoman Navy was made red, as red was to be the flag of secular institutions and green of religious ones. As the reforms abolished all the various flags (standards) of the Ottoman pashaliks, beyliks and emirates, a single new Ottoman national flag was designed to replace them. The result was the red flag with the white crescent moon and star, which is the precursor to the modern flag of Turkey. A plain red flag was introduced as the civil ensign for all Ottoman subjects.

After the foundation of the Republic of Turkey in 1923, the government maintained the last flag of the Ottoman Empire. Proportional standardisations were introduced in the Turkish Flag Law of 29 May 1936.

Source of the Star and Crescent symbol

It has been suggested that the star-and-crescent used in Ottoman flags of the 19th century had been adopted from the Byzantine. Franz Babinger (1992) suggests this possibility, noting that the crescent alone has a much older tradition also with Turkic tribes in the interior of Asia. The crescent and star is found on the coinage of Byzantium since the 4th century BC and was depicted on Byzantine Empire's coins and shields of Christian warrior saints till the 13th century. Parsons (2007) notes that the star and crescent was not a widespread motive on the coinage of Byzantium at the time of the Ottoman conquest. Turkish historians tend to stress the antiquity of the crescent (not star-and-crescent) symbol among the early Turkic states in Asia.

Imperial standards

The imperial standard displayed the sultan's tughra, often on a pink or bright red background.

The standard used by the last Caliph, Abdulmejid II (between 19 November 1922 – 3 March 1924) consisted of a green flag with a star and crescent in white on a red oval background within a rayed ornament, all in white.

Civil ensigns

See also

 Coat of arms of the Ottoman Empire
 Flag of Turkey
 List of Turkish flags

References

External links

 

1844 introductions
1844 establishments in the Ottoman Empire
Ottoman
History of the Ottoman Empire
Politics of the Ottoman Empire
Ottoman
Ottoman Empire

ko:오스만 제국의 국기